Leslie Stokes was an English playwright and BBC radio producer and director.

As a young man Leslie Stokes was an actor and later became a playwright and BBC radio producer and director. Together with his brother, author and playwright Sewell Stokes, he co-wrote a number of plays, including the success Oscar Wilde, starring Robert Morley as Wilde. It was this play which launched Robert Morley's career as a stage actor on both sides of the Atlantic. The film Oscar Wilde (1960) was based on the Stokes brothers' play.

External links

British radio producers
English dramatists and playwrights
Place of birth missing
Year of birth missing
Year of death missing
English male dramatists and playwrights